Smilax sect. Nemexia is a section of plants in the family Smilacaceae. It consists of the herbaceous plants within the genus Smilax. Smilax species fall into two groups with distinctive morphologies: one group has woody perennial stems with thorns and a vining habit, while the other group has herbaceous stems that die back to the ground each winter. S. sect. Nemexia is the taxon that comprises the herbaceous species. In the past it was often a genus of its own under the name Nemexia and taxonomists still need further study of the species of Smilax to determine its proper rank. However the widely accepted taxonomic system of the Flora of North America does not recognize Nemexia, nor does the AP-site. Thus Nemexia is not currently considered an accepted genus taxon by most plant taxonomists.

The plants in Smilax, are called carrion flowers for their malodorous flowers and those plants included in section Nemexia also have flowers that smell like rotten meat.  The herbaceous species have greenish-yellow flowers and bloom in spring, they are fly pollinated.

Phylogenetic relationships
Cladistic analysis among several members of the section was carried out in 2005 on several gene sequences, including the plastid trnL-F and rpl16 sequences and the nuclear internal transcribed spacer. The eastern North American species in the morphologically variable S. herbacea complex form a sister group to the western North American S. jamesii. The analysis did not conclusively clarify whether the S. herbacea complex should be recognized as different species. The two East Asian species, S. riparia and S. nipponica, formed two well-defined clades. It is hypothesized that the ancestor of this section evolved in Asia and spread to North America via the Bering Strait land bridge.

References

External links
 Smilacaceae in L. Watson and M.J. Dallwitz (1992 onwards). The families of flowering plants: descriptions, illustrations, identification, information retrieval. Version: 9 March 2006. http://delta-intkey.com.
 Smilacaceae in Flora of North America
 links at CSDL, Texas

The current entry states "The two East Asian species, S. riparia and S. nipponica, formed two well-defined clades."  But according to the abstract of reference 2 (Fu et al. 2005) "Results strongly  support a clade of two well-defined East Asian species, Smilax riparia and S. nipponica."  Thus, the entry should read:

"The two East Asian species, S. riparia and S. nipponica, formed a clade."

Smilacaceae
Plant sections